Events from the year 1639 in art.

Events
Rembrandt acquires a house in Jodenbreestraat, Amsterdam, now the Rembrandthuis museum.

Paintings

 Claude Lorrain
 Seaport at Sunset, sometimes referred to as View of a Seaport
 Village Fête
 Pietro da Cortona - Allegory of Divine Providence and Barberini Power
 Artemisia Gentileschi - Self-Portrait as the Allegory of Painting
 Guido Reni - The Rape of Europa
 Jusepe de Ribera
 Jacob’s Dream
 Martyrdom of Saint Bartholomew, an example of Mannerism and especially the influence of Caravaggio on a contemporary of Francisco de Zurbarán in Spain.
 Peter Paul Rubens - The Three Graces
 Diego Velázquez
 The Jester Calabacillas
 The Lady with a Fan
 Zhang Yan - Plum Blossoms in Snow

Births
May 8 – Giovanni Battista Gaulli (known as Il Baciccio), Italian painter of High Baroque (died 1709)
August 6 – Hans van Steenwinckel the Youngest, Danish sculptor and architect (died 1699)
date unknown
Hendrik Abbé, Flemish engraver, painter, and architect (died unknown)
Claude Audran the Younger, French painter (died 1684)
Ignatius Croon, Flemish Baroque painter (died 1667)
Louis de Chastillon,  French painter in enamel and miniature, and engraver (died 1734)
Dirck Ferreris, Dutch Golden Age painter (died 1693)
Abraham Myra, Finnish painter (died 1684)
Caspar Netscher, Dutch portrait and genre works painter (died 1684)
Bernardo Racchetti, Italian painter  of imaginary vedute (died 1702)
Cristoforo Savolini, Italian painter of altarpieces (died 1677)
Gian Domenico Valentini, Italian painter of still lifes (died 1715)

Deaths
January 12 - Reinhold Timm, Danish painter and teacher (born unknown)
February 
Orazio Gentileschi, Italian Baroque Caravaggisti painter (born 1563)
Roelant Savery, Dutch Golden Age painter (born 1576)
May 22 - Tiberio Tinelli, Italian painter of portraits of aristocracy, merchants, and intellectuals in Venice (born 1586)
July 22 - Rutilio di Lorenzo Manetti, Italian Mannerist painter (born 1571)
date unknown
Bernardino Capitelli, Italian painter and etcher (born 1589)
Chen Jiru, Chinese landscape painter and calligrapher during the Ming Dynasty (born 1558)
William Peake, English painter and printseller (born 1580)
Marcello Provenzale, Italian painter and mosaicist (born 1575)
Shōkadō Shōjō, Japanese Edo period Buddhist monk, painter, calligrapher and master of the tea ceremony (born 1584)
probable Baldassare d'Anna – Italian painter of the late-Renaissance period (born 1560)

 
Years of the 17th century in art
1630s in art